The thyrotropin receptor (or TSH receptor) is a receptor (and associated protein) that responds to thyroid-stimulating hormone (also known as "thyrotropin") and stimulates the production of thyroxine (T4) and triiodothyronine (T3).  The TSH receptor is a member of the G protein-coupled receptor superfamily of integral membrane proteins and is coupled to the Gs protein.

It is primarily found on the surface of the thyroid epithelial cells, but also found on adipose tissue and fibroblasts. The latter explains the reason of the myxedema finding during Graves disease. In addition, it has also been found to be expressed in the anterior pituitary gland, hypothalamus and kidneys. Its presence in the anterior pituitary gland may be involved in mediating the paracrine signaling feedback inhibition of thyrotropin along the hypothalamus-pituitary-thyroid axis.

Function 
Upon binding circulating TSH, a G-protein signal cascade activates adenylyl cyclase and intracellular levels of cAMP rise. cAMP activates all functional aspects of the thyroid cell, including iodine pumping; thyroglobulin synthesis, iodination, endocytosis, and proteolysis; thyroid peroxidase activity; and hormone release. TSHR is involved in regulating seasonal reproduction in vertebrates.

See also 
 Graves' disease

References

Further reading

External links 
 
 
 SSFA-GPHR: Sequence Structure Function Analysis of Glycoprotein Hormone Receptors
 GRIS: Glycoprotein-hormone Receptor Information System
 

G protein-coupled receptors
Thyroid